The Pic Central is a pyrenean summit, culminating at , located on the Franco-Spanish border in the massif du Vignemale, of which it constitutes the fourth highest peak.

Topography 
The French side is located in the Hautes-Pyrénées department, between Cauterets and Gavarnie, arrondissement of Argelès-Gazost in the Pyrenees National Park. The southern Spanish side is included in the « Reserva de la Biosfera Ordesa-Viñamala », in Torla territory, Huesca province.

References 

Mountains of the Pyrenees
Mountains of Hautes-Pyrénées
Mountains of Aragon
Pyrenean three-thousanders